RAF Templeton is a former Royal Air Force station located near Templeton, Pembrokeshire, Wales which was operational between December 1942 and July 1945. It remains in use as Templeton Dry Training Area.

History

RAF Templeton initially formed part of No. 17 Group RAF, the training organisation within RAF Coastal Command, and had a particular role in training for the defence of the oil installations in Milford Haven. No 306 Ferry Training Unit (Bristol Beaufort) formed at the station in January 1943, later departing to Maghaberry in Northern Ireland. The Observer training flight, "O" Flight, of No. 3 (Coastal) Operational Training Unit RAF (Avro Anson) moved in from nearby Haverfordwest, staying until December 1943. From December 1943 to May 1944, the station hosted an American unit, using British-built aircraft, 1st Gunnery and Tow Target Flight, VIII USAAF, (Westland Lysander and Miles Master) towing targets for the fighters at the American training base at RAF Atcham, Shropshire. During the latter part of 1944, anti-aircraft target-towing Miles Martinets and Supermarine Spitfires of No. 595 Squadron RAF, based at Aberporth, used the airfield. In January 1945, No 8 OTU moved into Haverfordwest, and "A" Flight was detached to Templeton, training aircrew on photo-reconnaissance aircraft including the Supermarine Spitfire and de Havilland Mosquito. They only stayed until March but a small engineering unit remained at Templeton to carry out aircraft repairs. They moved to Benson, Oxfordshire, in June.

In July 1945, the RAF closed RAF Templeton although No 74 Gliding School Air Training Corps continued to use part of the airfield as they had done since 1944.

The Royal Marines took over the camp in 1945 and it was used as a holding camp prior to de-mob for marines from all over the world.

Current use

In 2012 the site remained in MoD ownership as the Templeton Dry Training Area (part of the Pembrokeshire Defence Training Estate).

It is used for a variety of training tasks, including helicopter and air defence exercises, infantry and driver training. Usage is shared with a number of other activities, including agriculture, storage and model aircraft flying.

References

External links
  Templeton Airfield Interior Circular Walk

Royal Air Force stations in Wales
Training establishments of the British Army
Royal Air Force stations of World War II in the United Kingdom